Marat Robertovich Apshatsev (born 27 May 2001) is a Russian football player. He plays as a central midfielder for FC Rubin Kazan.

Club career
He made his debut in the Russian Football National League for FC Tom Tomsk on 15 September 2021 in a game against FC Torpedo Moscow.

On 3 December 2021, he signed a 4.5-year contract with FC Rubin Kazan. He made his debut in the Russian Premier League for Rubin on 28 February 2022 in a game against FC Zenit Saint Petersburg.

Career statistics

References

External links
 
 
 Profile by Russian Football National League

2001 births
Sportspeople from Nalchik
Living people
Russian footballers
Russia youth international footballers
Association football midfielders
PFC Spartak Nalchik players
FC Chayka Peschanokopskoye players
FC Tom Tomsk players
FC Rubin Kazan players
Russian Second League players
Russian First League players
Russian Premier League players